Stan Edwards may refer to:

 Stan Edwards (born 1960), American football player
 Stan Edwards (footballer, born 1942), English footballer
 Stan Edwards (footballer, born 1926) (1926–1989), English footballer